Jeru may refer to:

 Gerry Mulligan or Jeru, American musician (1927–1996)
 Jeru the Damaja, American musician (born 1972)
 Jeru people, an indigenous tribe of the Andaman Islands
 Jeru language or Aka-Jeru, spoken by the Jeru
 Jeru, Iran, a village in Fars Province, Iran
 Jeru (album), a 1962 album recorded by American jazz saxophonist and bandleader Gerry Mulligan